Yamina or Yemina is an Israeli political alliance of right-wing parties that originally included the New Right and the Union of Right-Wing Parties (a union of The Jewish Home and Tkuma). The current incarnation of the alliance includes only the New Right, as The Jewish Home left the alliance on 14 July 2020, and the Religious Zionist Party left on 20 January 2021.

The list was created ahead of the September 2019 Israeli legislative election, in which Yamina secured seven seats in the Knesset. The alliance was expected to split on 6 October, with the New Right as its own faction, while Tkuma and the Jewish Home will stay together, though the alliance continued to negotiate as a single bloc in the aftermath of the election. The meeting on 6 October was postponed, with some citing disagreements on whether Yamina should split, while others referred to it as a "technical" matter. The alliance did split on 10 October 2019, and re-formed on 15 January 2020 in the run-up to the 2020 Israeli legislative election.

History

On 21 July 2019, after not making it past the electoral threshold in the April 2019 Israeli legislative election, New Right leader Naftali Bennett decided to give leadership of the party to Ayelet Shaked. In her opening leadership speech, Shaked declared that she will seek to unite with the Union of Right-Wing Parties (URWP) and other right-wing parties.

The following day, negotiations with the URWP began. The negotiations initially stalled, as URWP leader Rafi Peretz was unwilling to concede leadership of the list to Shaked, and disagreements arose over how many spots each of the three involved parties would receive on the list. Another subject that arose in the negotiations was whether the radical former URWP member Otzma Yehudit should be included in the new joint list.

Sara Netanyahu (the wife of the former prime minister) was recorded speaking with Rafi Peretz' wife, Michal Peretz, in an attempt to convince Peretz to retain his number one slot on the list; she was unsuccessful. It was also revealed that Benjamin Netanyahu was involved (despite his denial). The URWP and the New Right agreed to a joint run on 29 July 2019, with the New Right's Ayelet Shaked leading the joint list. As part of the agreement, the alliance declared that they would negotiate together to establish a right-wing government under Benjamin Netanyahu.

On 22 April 2020, it was reported that Bennett was now "considering all options" for Yamina's political future, including departing from Netanyahu's government, which had just agreed to form a joint government with leader of the opposition Blue and White party Benny Gantz, and joining the opposition. Bennett was reported to be unhappy with the new coalition government's decision to hold back on the issue of judicial reform.

In May 2020, Yamina announced that it would go to opposition. The day before, Peretz, the leader of The Jewish Home, had split from the party, and would be named as the Minister of Jerusalem in the thirty-fifth government of Israel. On 17 May 2020, Bennett met with Gantz, who also succeeded him as Defence Minister, and declared that Yamina was now a "head held high" member of the opposition.

Tkuma, which rebranded as the Religious Zionist Party on 7 January 2021, split from Yamina on 20 January. On 9 May 2021, it was reported that Bennett and Yesh Atid leader Yair Lapid had made major headway in the coalition talks for forming a new Israeli government. On 30 May 2021, Bennett announced in a televised address that Yamina would join a unity government with Yair Lapid after all but one Yamina MK agreed to back this decision. A poll at the time found that 61% of Yamina voters would not vote for the party due to it being part of the unity government.

Yamina announced on 27 July 2022 that it had allied with Derekh Eretz as the Zionist Spirit alliance to contest the 2022 Israeli legislative election. Yamina left the alliance on 11 September 2022, at the insistence of The Jewish Home, which had asked on 9 September that Shaked split from Derekh Eretz as a prerequisite for a joint run between itself and Shaked. 
Party members of The Jewish Home (including Hagit Moshe and Yossi Brodny) had ratified an agreement on a joint run between Yamina and itself two days later. The joint run was expected to be announced on 12 September, though it was not held that day due to disagreements within The Jewish Home on the details. The announcement was made the next day and the joint run was approved by the central committee of The Jewish Home on 14 September.

Platform
Ayelet Shaked listed 11 principles that the Yamina list is determined to uphold:
Jewish Identity: 
Nationality: We will act for the implementation of the Nation-state Law and the prevention of any harm to it, while continuing to ensure individual rights and equality for all Israeli citizens.
Unity of the land: We are the only party that opposes the establishment of a Palestinian state and any withdrawal from the territories of the Land of Israel. We will work to develop settlements throughout the country.
Sovereignty: We will act for the full and equitable application of national sovereignty and the rule of law to all citizens and residents of Israel, including the end of the military administration of West Bank and the application of Israeli sovereignty to the Israeli-occupied West Bank.
Determination against terror: We will defeat terrorism with determination and without compromise, we will defeat Gaza border terrorism and end the allowances paid to terrorists by the Palestinian Authority. We will bring back the corpses of IDF soldiers and charge a price from Hamas for its actions, with total resistance to the release of imprisoned terrorists. We will act to assist disabled IDF veterans and the victims of the conflict.
Aliyah: We will work towards the implementation of a national Aliyah policy, which will promote Jewish immigration and remove unnecessary barriers to immigration. We will prevent illegal immigration of migrant workers to Israel and prevent the abuse of family re-unification policies.
Competition and liberty: We will promote competition to break up monopolies and cartels, open the economy to international competition, and reduce central planning in the economy. We will promote competition in the housing market, release land for construction, and implement taxation policies that will spur development. We will streamline regulation, reduce the regulatory burden on employers, which will encourage employment and productivity, and create a comfortable environment for a sharing economy and the high tech industry.
Right to work: We will reform the labor law so that unions can only represent all workers in a workplace if they have a majority of its workers unionized. We will implement mandatory government arbitration to solve labor disputes in essential government services and increase transparency in labor organizations.
Governability: We will strengthen the values of governability and democracy. We will strengthen the status of the Knesset as a legislative authority and restore confidence in the Supreme Court as the judicial authority, in accordance with the law. We will strengthen the status of elected officials in the face of the un-elected bureaucracy.
Social responsibility: We will enact economic and medical protection for the disabled and the elderly, while integrating people with disabilities in education, society, and the labor market.
Galilee and the Negev: We will strengthen the Galilee and the Negev with additional employment opportunities, housing, health care, tourism, culture, and transport. We will encourage capital investment and private initiatives that will strengthen human capital and allow families to settle and remain in the Galilee and the Negev. We will strengthen agriculture and the Labor settlements.
Alongside these united principles, each party retains its own independent platform. Thus, the New Right represents the more "liberal" Religious and Secular right, The Jewish Home represents "mainstream" Religious Zionism, while Tkuma represents the more hawkish and Chardal Religious Zionists.

Composition

Current

Former

Former MKs 
Yamina had four members at the end of the 24th Knesset.

 – New Right

A number of Yamina MKs have left the party during the 24th Knesset.

Leaders

Election results

References

External links 

2019 disestablishments in Israel
2022 disestablishments in Israel
2019 establishments in Israel
2020 establishments in Israel
Conservative parties in Israel
Naftali Bennett
Orthodox Jewish political parties
Political parties disestablished in 2020
Political parties disestablished in 2022
Political parties established in 2019
Political parties established in 2020
Political party alliances in Israel
Religious Zionist political parties in Israel
Right-wing parties
Right-wing politics in Israel
Social conservative parties